Katerynopil Raion was a raion (district) of Cherkasy Oblast in central Ukraine. Its administrative center was located at the urban-type settlement of Katerynopil. The raion was abolished on 18 July 2020 as part of the administrative reform of Ukraine, which reduced the number of raions of Cherkasy Oblast to four. The area of Chornobai Raion was merged into Zvenyhorodka Raion. The last estimate of the raion population was  

At the time of disestablishment, the raion consisted of three hromadas:
 Katerynopil settlement hromada with the administration in Katerynopil;
 Mokra Kalyhirka rural hromada with the administration in the selo of Mokra Kalyhirka;
 Yerky settlement hromada with the administration in the urban-type settlement of Yerky.

People from Katerynopil Raion
 Semen Hryzlo (1887), Ukrainian military and civil activist, organizer of the Free Cossacks.
 Viacheslav Chornovil, Ukrainian politician, earlier a prominent Ukrainian dissident to the Soviet policies

References

Former raions of Cherkasy Oblast
Mining cities and regions in Ukraine
1923 establishments in Ukraine
Ukrainian raions abolished during the 2020 administrative reform